Doohan is an ancient Irish surname, its oldest origins are found on Tory Island, County Donegal, Ireland. Doohan is the English translation of  Dhubghain (dubh=black). The name is derived from Dubhgain (Duggan), where the 'g' is softened by a 'gh'. Notable people with the name include:

 Chris Doohan (born 1959), Canadian actor
 Hunter Doohan (born 1994), Canadian actor
 Jack Doohan (politician) (1920–2007), Australian politician
 Jack Doohan (racing driver) (born 2003), Australian racing driver
 James Doohan (1920–2005), Irish-Canadian character and voice actor
 Mick Doohan (born 1965), Australian Grand Prix motorcycle road racing World Champion
 Peter Doohan (1961–2017), Australian tennis player
 Scott Doohan (born 1963), Australian Grand Prix motorcycle racer

References

Anglicised Irish-language surnames